The Van Liew-Suydam House is located at 280 South Middlebush Road in Somerset, New Jersey. It was built in the 18th century by Peter Van Liew. Joseph Suydam later built an addition to the house. The  largest section of the house was built in 1875.

In October 2019, filming began on a Stephen King miniseries starring Julianne Moore and Clive Owen at the house.

See also
Meadows Foundation (New Jersey)

References

Meadows Foundation (New Jersey)
Franklin Township, Somerset County, New Jersey
Houses in Somerset County, New Jersey
Historic house museums in New Jersey
Museums in Somerset County, New Jersey